Inal Nekhu (also known as Inal the Great in Georgian sources) was the Supreme Prince (King) of Circassia from 1427 to 1453 who unified all Circassians (then divided into several princedoms) into one state. He led campaigns into several countries and expanded borders on all directions. He was the founder of several Circassian tribes, mainly Kabardia, Besleney, Temirgoy, Zhaney, and Hatuqwai.

Although the origin of Inal's nickname (Nef/Nekhu) is not known, sources claim that he had one eye blind, therefore it came from the word "Нэф" meaning "blind" in Circassian, and some claim that it came from the word "Нэху" meaning "enlightened" in Circassian.

Biography 
Before the rise of Inal, the established lords in Circassia had separate territorial administration and an organized structure was not developed. Although the Circassians resisted Timurid forces in the Timur-Circassian wars, the Circassian region suffered great destruction as a result of this war.

Early life 
He was born in the Taman Peninsula near modern-day Crimea and was raised among the princely caste. As a young boy, he was well-trained, proficient in martial arts, and educated about the vast land of the Circassian country and the numerous clans that controlled land and power throughout the homeland.

Rise to power 
Inal initially owned land in the Taman peninsula. A skilled strategist, in the early 1400s, he gathered a force mainly consisting of the Khegayk clan and set out to complete his goal of creating a unified Circassian kingdom under fealty. While Circassian lordships fell into Inal's hands one by one, he fought and defeated warlords and clan chieftains. Despite the many attempts to divide and weaken his army, he used political intrigue to ward off any assassinations and divisions in his military.  

Inal's rise disturbed established Circassian lords, and a confederation of 30 Circassian clans opposing Inal formed an alliance to fight him. In a battle near the Mzymta River, the coalition of thirty Circassian lords was defeated by Inal and his supporters. Ten of them were executed, while the remaining twenty lords declared allegiance and joined the forces of Inal's new state.

Conquests

Conquest of Kuban and Eastern Circassia 
Inal, who then ruled Western Circassia, organized a campaign to Eastern Circassia in 1434 and established the Kabardia province, named after his military general, Kabard. Inal organized a new campaign to the north in 1438 and drove out the Turkic nomads near the Circassian settlements north of the Kuban River along the Ten River and expanded his borders to modern-day Azov.

Conquest of Abkhazia 
As the Circassian provinces began to unite under him, Inal turned his attention to Abkhazia, who has ethnic ties to the Circassians, where the Abkhazian clans Anchabadze and Shervashidze declared fealty. Together they defeated the opposing Mingrelians and unified Northern Abkhazia with Circassia. The Abkhaz people recognized Inal's rule, and Inal finalized his rule in Abkhazia. The Georgian Chronicles mention Inal leading Circassians and Abkhazians against Mingrelians. As a token of this moment, the statue of Inal stands in Abkhazia today. One of the stars on the flag of Abkhazia represents Inal's alleged grave, Inal-Quba.

Johannes de Galonifontibus describes that at the turn of the XIV and XV centuries, Circassia expanded its borders to the north to the mouth of the Don, and he notes that “the city and port of Tana is located in the same country in Upper Circassia, on the Don River, which separates Europe from Asia". His description matches with Inal's expansions.

Reforms

Administrative reforms 
When his conquests subsided, Inal began to take measures to develop the Circassian nation by introducing reforms, organizing tribes and instituting courts of elders to govern the concerns of the Circassian provinces. He divided his possessions into four counties: Qabard, Beslan, Kemirghoqo, and Zhanaqo-Hatuqwai. He introduced the institution of 40 judges. However, Circassia was split up again after his death into separate feudal principalities.

The city of Shanjir 
After taking over the entire Circassian land with effective expansions, Inal declared the Grand Principality of Circassia, taking the title of the Grand Prince/King and the Leader of the Circassian Highlanders. The capital of this new Circassian state became the city of Shanjir also known as Jansher, founded in the Taman region where Inal was born and raised. Peter Simon Pallas and Julius von Klaproth were the first researchers to draw attention to the city of Shanjir in history, they both described the city of Shanjir similarly. According to them, Shanjir was very "cleverly designed", had the shape of a rectangle surrounded by walls and moats, and had four gates, thus reminiscent of Roman strategic architecture. In the north, fake hills were built to gain an advantage over the enemy. Klaproth visited the ruins of the city of Shanjir, met the Circassian elders and gathered detailed information about the city. According to the information he learned, Shanjir was in an area close to Anapa.

Although the city's exact location is unknown, the general opinion is that the Krasnaya Batareya region fits the descriptions by Klarapoth and Pallas.

Death and burial 
Inal divided his lands between his sons and grandchildren in 1453 and died in 1458. Following this, Circassian tribal principalities were formed. According to the Abkhaz claim, Inal died in Northern Abkhazia. This place is known today as Inal-Quba and is located in the Pskhu region. Although most sources used to accept this theory, recent researches and excavations in the region show that Inal's tomb is not here.

According to Russian explorer and archaeologist Evgeniy Dimitrievich Felitsin, Inal's tomb is not in Abkhazia. In a map published in 1882, Felitsin attached great importance to Inal but placed his grave in the Ispravnaya region in Karachay-Cherkessia, not Abkhazia. He added that this area has ancient sculptures, mounds, tombs, churches, castles and ramparts, which would be an ideal tomb for someone like Inal.

Ancestors

Legacy 

The Circassian and Abkhazian princes in following centuries claimed to be descendants of Inal and regarded him as their progenitor. Inal's name is also present in many geographical names in the Caucasus, as many places were named after him following his death. Place names associated with the name of Inal are found in Adygea, Krasnodar Krai, Kabardino-Balkaria, Karachay-Cherkessia and Abkhazia. On the Black Sea coast of Circassia, there is the Inal Bay. In the Zolsk region of the Republic of Kabardino-Balkaria, not far from Mount Kanzhal, there is mount Inal (2990 m) between Baksan River and Tyzyl valleys. Variations of Inal (Yinal, Inal, Yanal, etc.) are common names among Circassians and Abkhazians. There are many statues of Inal, especially in Abkhazia.

References

Sources 
 Caucasian Review. Vol. 2. Munich (München), 1956. Pp.; 19; 35.
 
 Latham, Robert Gordon. Descriptive Ethnology. London: Voorst, 1859. Pp. 51.

Inal
Circassians
1460s deaths
Eastern Orthodox monarchs